Eskayan is an artificial auxiliary language of the Eskaya people of Bohol, an island province of the Philippines. It is grammatically Boholano, the native language of Bohol, with a substituted lexicon. While Eskayan has no mother-tongue speakers, it is taught by volunteers in at least three cultural schools in the southeast interior of the province.

Eskayan has a number of idiosyncrasies that have attracted wide interest. One of its most immediately remarkable features is its unique writing system of over 1,000 syllabic characters, said to be modeled on parts of the human body, and its non-Philippine lexicon.

The earliest attested document in Eskayan provisionally dates from 1908, and was on display at the Bohol Museum until September 2006.

History 
According to speakers, the Eskaya language and script were creations of Pinay, the ancestor of the Eskaya people, who was inspired by human anatomy. Pinay's language was "rediscovered" in the early 20th century by Mariano Datahan (born Mariano Sumatra, ca. 1875–1949), a Messianic rebel soldier who transmitted it to his followers. Datahan had founded a utopian community in southeast Bohol in the aftermath of the Philippine–American War, in order to resist imperial claims and establish an indigenous nation in Bohol, and the Eskayan language and script were seen as the embodiment of this incipient national culture.

Recent research strongly suggests that the Eskayan language was created in the period after Spanish contact had been established.  Evidence of this includes the presence of "native" terms (i.e., not borrowed or calqued) for post-contact cultural categories such as pope and aeroplane. Further, the language makes semantic distinctions that are made in Spanish and English but not in Visayan (such as between moon and month). It is highly plausible that Eskayan vocabulary was created by taking parallel Spanish-English-Visayan wordlists from textbooks, and replacing the Visayan layer with new vocabulary. Finally, the Eskayan script bears strong similarities to 19th-century Copperplate handwriting.

Indigenous constructed languages with accompanying creation myths are attested elsewhere in the world. One notable case is the Damin ceremonial language of the Gulf of Carpentaria which is said to have been the creation of the ancestor Kalthad; another are the Pandanus languages of the Medan region of Papua New Guinea.

Classification 
Eskayan is a "sophisticated encryption" of the Cebuano language. It shows no lexical similarity to any of the indigenous languages of the Philippines, apart from a very few Cebuano words. Grammatically, however, it is Cebuano. Most of the words were invented, though with inspiration from Spanish and English vocabulary and phonotactics. Some Spanish words had their meanings changed, such as  'sun' (from 'star') and  'two' (from 'three').

Linguist Ernesto Constantino (Professor of the Linguistics Department of the University of the Philippines) argued that the Visayan-Eskaya ethnolanguage is only a constructed language whose phonology, grammar, and/or vocabulary have been consciously devised by an individual or group, instead of having evolved naturally. This ethnolanguage would then be comparable to Esperanto and Ido in origin, though not in purpose.

Writing system 

The Eskayan script has both alphabetic and syllabic components. A basic 'alphabet' of 46 characters accounts for most of the common sounds and syllables used in Eskayan while a broader subset totalling over 1000 is used to represent the remaining syllables. The unusual diversity of consonant and vowel clusters accounts for this relatively large number of composite characters, which even includes superfluous symbols.
The symbols are said to be based on parts of the human anatomy, though many are clearly based on the cursive Roman alphabet.

Romanised orthography 
A romanised form of Eskayan is used in the cultural schools for the purpose of exposition. Although not strictly standardised, this orthography has elements in common with the Spanish system once used for transliterating Cebuano. A notable innovation in Eskayan romanised orthography is the letter combination 'chd' which represents the sound .

Phonology and phonotactics 
With the exception of this phoneme, Eskayan shares the same basic phonology as Cebuano-Visayan, Tagalog and many other Philippine languages.

The phonotactics of Eskayan, on the other hand, are quite different from those of Boholano-Visayan and Philippine languages generally. Furthermore, a significant number of Eskayan words have phonemic sequences that are common in Spanish or in Spanish loans into Boholano-Visayan but appear rarely, if ever, in non-borrowed words.

Case system 
Eskayan conforms to the same syntactic and morphological structure as Cebuano. Accordingly, Eskayan nouns are uninflected but may be marked for case with one of several preceding case markers.

The table below shows the basic case system of Eskayan, with Cebuano equivalents in brackets.

Eskayan and Cebuano texts, which are always written face-to-face in the bilingual Eskayan books, generally have a one-to-one correspondence. For example:

Pronouns 
Eskayan personal pronouns are also marked by case. In the table below, the Cebuano equivalents are indicated in brackets. (These pronouns are drawn from a limited corpus; omissions are indicated by [] and uncertainties with an asterisk.)

Lexicon

Cebuano influences 
Despite its structural equivalence to Eskayan, Cebuano has had a very limited lexical influence on the language. In a comparison of core Swadesh vocabulary, there are eight identifiable cognates.

Eskayan words have a one-to-one correspondence with Cebuano, so that when two words are homophones in Cebuano, they are homophones in Eskayan as well. However, the verbal morphology is quite different: Cebuano has twenty-four verbal affixes which indicate grammatical aspect and other feature, whereas Eskayan has just five (muy-, dil-, pur-, yu-, yi-), each of which can substitute for any of the Cebuano affixes. This often makes Eskayan grammar ambiguous, and dependent on the parallel Cebuano text. In addition, some Eskayan verbs are equivalent to specific inflections of Cebuano verbs despite not having any morphology. For example, Eskayan  'was taken on', which is basic root, translates Cebuano , where gi- indicates that the action is completed and performed on the grammatical agent. This is likely because the prototype for many Eskayan words was an early English–Spanish–Visayan trilingual, with the Visayan (Cebuano) glosses crossed out and replaced with Eskayan.

Spanish influences 
Although the Eskayan lexicon bears a marked Spanish influence, the loan-patterns are hard to map. Some Spanish words appear to have been directly borrowed into Eskayan with virtually no semantic or phonetic alterations. E.g., the Eskayan word , meaning 'husband', is evidently borrowed from the Spanish , also meaning 'husband'. Others retain only a few of the semantic properties of the original. E.g., the word  means 'sun' in Eskayan but 'star' in Spanish. In some interesting cases Eskayan lexical items appear to be borrowed but are assigned new meanings entirely. E.g., the Eskayan  ('sky') does not coincide semantically with the Spanish  ('memory'). One of the most intriguing examples of such an 'interrupted loan' is that of the Eskayan  ('two') seemingly derived from the Spanish  ('three'). Here the semantic property of 'number' was retained but the actual quantity it represented was reassigned.

Text

Theories and controversies 
In the 1980s and 1990s, the Eskaya community attracted the interest of local mystics who promoted the notion that their language was of exotic origin. Today, the few linguists who have examined Eskayan generally concur that it is structurally Cebuano but lexically innovative, suggesting that Eskayan is an auxiliary language or a highly sophisticated form of disguised speech encoded from Cebuano.

References

Further reading

External links

Constructed languages
Mixed languages
Languages of Bohol
Verb–subject–object languages
Constructed scripts
Constructed languages introduced in the 20th century
Spanish language in the Philippines
Philippine English